Georg Ertl (17 March 1901 – 22 October 1968) was a German international footballer.

References

1901 births
1968 deaths
Association football goalkeepers
German footballers
Germany international footballers
TSV 1860 Munich managers
German football managers